John Hibbs may refer to:

 John Hibbs (academic) (born 1936), American physician-scientist and educator
 John Hibbs (rugby league), New Zealand rugby league footballer